Cornelius Minor Hadley (April 27, 1838 – March 22, 1902) was a Union Army soldier in the American Civil War who received the U.S. military's highest decoration, the Medal of Honor.

Hadley was born in Sandy Creek, New York on April 27, 1838 and entered service at Adrian, Michigan. He was awarded the Medal of Honor, for extraordinary heroism shown on November 20, 1863, while serving as a Sergeant with Company F, 9th Michigan Volunteer Cavalry Regiment, at the Siege of Knoxville, Tennessee. His Medal of Honor was issued on April 5, 1898.

Hadley died at the age of 63, on March 22, 1902 and was buried at Mount Hope Cemetery in Litchfield, Michigan.

Medal of Honor citation

Notes

References

External links
The Civil War Archive

1838 births
1902 deaths
People from Sandy Creek, New York
Burials in Michigan
People of Michigan in the American Civil War
Union Army soldiers
United States Army Medal of Honor recipients
American Civil War recipients of the Medal of Honor
People from Adrian, Michigan